Aroostook Farm is an experimental farm near Presque Isle, Maine. Founded in 1914, it is the largest ( of the University of Maine's five experimental farms. In January 2020, Potato Grower Magazine wrote that "over the last century-plus, much has been accomplished on that plot of land that has brought the entire North American potato industry into the future, while remaining steadfastly focused on the growers, processors and wholesalers of Maine."

References

Buildings and structures in Presque Isle, Maine
Experimental farms in the United States
Protected areas affiliated with the University of Maine
Farms in Aroostook County, Maine
1914 establishments in Maine
Buildings and structures completed in 1914
Potatoes
Research institutes in Maine